Jeffrey Isaac (born 1956 in New York) is a painter and video artist. His style often uses photorealism as a means to a conceptual inquiry of fantastical content with an absurdist approach.

He also uses several pseudonyms including Prof. Dr. Dr. Zagreus Bowery, publisher of the so-called "world's smallest magazine of its kind" Public Illumination Magazine.

Art 
Isaac has exhibited widely across the US and Europe. His work incorporates a range of media, from digital art to oil on canvas; he is particularly known for his installations, often incorporating
sound and performance as well as panoramas and dioramic cabinets.

In 2016 he created a major installation, titled 'Earthly Delights' of large-scale cut-out paintings, suspended in a re-purposed church, with a concurrent performance by Nyla van Ingen, Myriam Laplante, Daniela Malusardi and Dan Kinzelman.

His exhibition 'Manifest Destinies' (2009) at Cà Zanardi, Venice, was part of an ambitious series of multi-site collateral shows of the 53rd Venice Biennale "Detournement Venise 2009", in a 2-story former cookie factory. It included monumental history paintings such as "Flotilla of Fools" depicting all 196 heads of state, wearing fool's hats, posing on shipwrecks.

He created the animation for the 2007 performance of ‘Il Corvo’ by the La Mama Experimental Theater Company at the 38th Biennale Teatro in Venice.

In 1993 he had a solo exhibition at Galleria Marilena Bonomo in Bari, titled '93 Olives' and in 1994 a solo show at Salvatore Ala Gallery in Soho, NYC titled ‘Subway to Italy’.

At the 1990 Spoleto Festival in Italy, he presented a 350° walk-in panorama of the Umbrian village Bazzano Superiore (later shown in Rome and Bari and currently held in the LeWitt Collection, Chester, CT, USA). It was installed in the geodesic dome in Spoleto known as the Spoletosfera, designed by Buckminster Fuller.

With public funding from NYSCA, Isaac curated a series of exhibitions in a storefront gallery in Lower Manhattan named Public Illumination Picture Gallery. The two-year program (1982–1983) included work by David Wojnarowicz, Mimi Gross, Christian Marclay, Barbara Ess and Rudy Burckhardt amongst others. For the final exhibition he created an interactive multi-media installation titled 'Exhibition in a maze'.

Publishing 
In 1984 his book "Twelve Picturesque Passions" was sponsored by Printed Matter, Inc, partially funded by a LINE grant. It was at this time that he met the American artist Sol LeWitt, one of the co-founders of Printed Matter, who later became a friend and neighbor. In 2017 an exhibition about Isaac's relationship with LeWitt was staged at the Chelsea College of Arts Library titled "Exchanges between Sol LeWitt and Jeffrey Isaac in Spoleto, Italy, and New York and Chester, Connecticut USA". It was curated by Jo Melvin, Reader in Fine Art, Archives and Special Collections at Chelsea College of Art.

Since 1979 Isaac has published an artists' periodical, notable for its tiny size, called Public Illumination Magazine. Each issue has a unique theme with contributions by numerous artists using pseudonyms.
Through 2017, sixty issues have been published. It is included in the collections of the New York Public Library, Museum of Modern Art, New York, Pompidou Center, Paris, and others.

Life 

Born in the US, he spent his childhood in Switzerland before moving back to the United States where he studied painting at Rhode Island School of Design (B.F.A 1977) and at Camberwell School of Art in London (under the recommendation of Frank Bowling). In 1977 he moved to NYC where his activities expanded to publishing, performance art and curating. In 1979 he developed the format for and co-managed the performance series Avant-Garde-Arama at the venue Performance Space 122. Under the alias Eddie Grand he performed in the art-rock band “Listen to the Animal” with Barbara Ess, Judith Wong and Al Arthur, at venues such as CBGB, the Mudd Club and The Public Theater.

In 1986 he moved to Umbria near the town of Spoleto, befriending artists Sol LeWitt, Carol and Michael Venezia, Afranio Metelli, Robin Heidi Kennedy, Marco Tirelli, Myriam Laplante, Franco Troiani, Emanuele de Donno and Nyla van Ingen.

During the period from 1999 to 2006, he produced a series of video animations featuring skeletons, saints and devils.

In 2004, a minor scandal surrounded a banner he had painted at the invitation of the town of Foligno for a historical pageant depicting the patron saint San Feliciano naked on horseback.

Selected exhibitions 
 102 Hands, Museo della Chirurgia, Preci, Italy; Museo Archeologico, Spoleto, Italy, 2016, 2017
 Earthly Delights, Performing Santa Caterina, Foligno, Italy, 2016
 Spoleto Contemporanea, Museo Carandente, Spoleto, Italy, 2015
 Ovest, Palazzo Leonetti-Luparini, Spoleto, Italy, 2015
 CLOSE UP, Museo Carandente, Spoleto, Italy, 2015
 Baculus, Museo Carandente etc., Spoleto, Italy, 2014
 Ricognizione 2014 – Arte Contemporanea in Umbria, CIAC, Foligno, Italy, 2014
 IL TEATRINO DELLE BELLE FIGURE, Biblioteca comunale – Rocca Albornoziana, Spoleto, Italy, 2011–12
 +50, Museo Carandente, Spoleto, Italy, 2012
 Porträt, Kunstraum T27, Berlin, Germany, 2010
 Walking the Dog, Kunsthalle Dominikanerkirche, Osnabrueck, Germany, 2010
 Mediamorfosi 2.0, Sublab, Portici, Italy, 2010
 OSTRALE´010, Zentrum für zeitgenössische Kunst, Dresden, Germany, 2010
 Natur – Mensch 2010, Nationalpark Harz, Sankt Andreasberg, Germany, 2010
 Horizonte, Altes Museum Neukölln, Berlin, Germany, 2010
 Nord Art 2010, Kunst in der Carlshütte, Büddelsdorf, Germany, 2010
 LUST, 1. Bazonnale, Weimar, Germany, 2010 
 Druckfigur, Galerie Südliches Friesland, Zetel, Germany, 2009
 MANIFEST DESTINIES, 53. Biennale d´Arte, Venice, Italy, 2009
 MAnATURE, 48 Stunden Neukölln, Berlin, Germany 2009 
 ...Where Angels Fear to Tread, Galleria Civica d'Arte Moderna, Spoleto, Italy, 2009
 I diavoli di Jeffrey Isaac, Villa Fabri o Boemi, Trevi, Italy, 2008
 Dogs, Devils & Disasters, Kunstverein Schwetzingen, Germany, 2007
 Videosanti, c.a.l.m.a., Perugia, Italy, 2007
 Profane & Sacred, Auditorium della Stella, Spoleto, Italy, 2006
 10 Dog’s Tales, Festival dei Presidi, Orbetello, Italy, 1999
 Umbrian Walk, Castello di Poreta, Spoleto, Italy, 1998
 Magic Show, Galerie Commercio, Zürich, Switzerland, 1998
 Passage of Birds, Monti Associazione Culturale, Rome, Italy, 1997
 Subway to Caserta, Mediarte, Caserta, Italy, 1996
 Animal Portraits, Planita, Rome; Palazzo Comunale, Spoleto, Italy,1995
 Per mari e monti, Macerata, Italy, 1995
 Bestiario" Studio Cristofori, Bologna, Italy, 1994
 Kleine Retrospektive, Galerie Commercio, Zürich, Switzerland, 1994
 Subway to Italy, Salvatore Ala, NYC, USA, 1994
 Panorama di Bazzano Superiore, Planita, Rome, Italy, 1994
 Dina Carola, Naples, Italy 1993
 93 Olives, Galleria Marilena Bonomo, Bari, Italy, 1993
 Madonna del Pozzo, Galleria Marilena Bonomo, Bari, Italy, 1991
 Galerie Feusisberg, Feusisberg, Switzerland, 1990
 Panorama di Bazzano Superiore, Spoletosfera, Festival of Two Worlds, Spoleto, Italy, 1990
 Neue Galerie a16, Zürich, Switzerland, 1990
 Galerie Nada Relic, Zürich, Switzerland, 1990
 Palazzo Rosari Spada, Spoleto, Italy, 1989
 Galerie Nada Relic, Zürich, Switzerland, 1988
 Galerie Murbach, Horgen, Switzerland, 1987
 Edison Hall Gallery, Edison, NJ, USA, 1985
 Phenix City Art Gallery, NYC, USA, 1985
 Centre d'Art Contemporain, Geneva, Switzerland, 1984
 ZONA, Florence, Italy, 1982
 Galerie 38, Zürich, Switzerland, 1979, 1977, 1976

Books 
 640 drawings done at the speed of a Xerox 4500 photocopier, 1978, Jeffrey Isaac
 Twelve Picturesque Passions, Public Illumination Editions, 1984, Jeffrey Isaac
 91 Animal Portraits, Public Illumination Editions, Planita-Roma, 1996, Jeffrey Isaac
 477 Paintings, 2005, Jeffrey Isaac

References

External links 

 
 Public Illumination Magazine, website
 Jeffrey Isaac, portfolio of works
 Flavorwire article, 'Dispatches from the Field: The Electronic Life of an Expat' 
 Art & Perception article 'Dialogue with artist Jeffrey Isaac'

20th-century American painters
American male painters
21st-century American painters
21st-century American male artists
American video artists
1956 births
Artists from New York (state)
Living people
American contemporary painters
20th-century American male artists